Pablo Cesar Minoli Dominguez (born April 9, 1970) is a composer, guitarist and music producer. He was one of the founders of Venezuelan metal band Laberinto and D-Compose and performed with soul music, hip hop, funk and reggae artists throughout the Netherlands.
It is currently one of the metal band's members Seita, of Netherlands.

Pablo Minoli was born in Montevideo, Uruguay. He moved to Venezuela with his parents when he was a teenager, but they moved back to Uruguay a few years later.
Pablo only stayed in Uruguay for a little while and then moved to Venezuela by himself where he studied guitar at the Roland Music Academy in Caracas from 1986–1990.
In 1992 he moved to Amsterdam where he still lives.

Biography

Laberinto
He formed the band Laberinto in 1989 in Venezuela together with Marco Toro Bernal (drums), Raymundo Ceballos (vocals), Gregorio Rangel (bass), Miguel Padron (percussion). In 1992 they move to Amsterdam where they struggle to live from their own music. They form a coverband called Santanico to make money that way.
But after appearing in a TV show they join an agency and start getting more bookings. Their first CD "Laberinto" appears in 1995, released by themselves and gets good reviews. They start touring Europe in Hungry, Germany, Switzerland, England, Belgium and Italy.

Laberinto signs with record company Mascot Records in 1996 for their second album Priority. They tour in England, Switzerland, Italy, Denmark and Belgium and they play festivals like Dynamo Open Air (1997), Borec Trinec Festival (Czech Republic), WDR Rockpalast, Rocknacht, Bizzare Festival, Wacken Open Air, WaldRock.
They did Radio- and TV specials in Germany, Venezuela and the Netherlands (VPRO's Lola da Musica and TMF -The Music Factory).

Accident
In 1997 Minoli was hospitalized at the intensive care for three weeks  after an accident on May 24 at his apartment. A fire made him jump out of the window on the second floor. His recovery went well and soon he could rejoin Laberinto. Throughout Amsterdam benefits were organized by musicians to help him with the hospital bills.

Since 2004
In 2004 Minoli left Laberinto to explore new options.

He founded the extreme metal band D-Compose and tours in Italy, Poland, Germany and Czech Republic.

He performs with Brainpower, Big Boy Caprice, Junior Tecla, Ledisi, Shirma Rouse, Maikal X, Strawl and The Cousins and Hind (amongst others).
In 1996 he joins an acoustic project of John van der Veer: the Ark and performs at festivals like the International Guitar festival (Bath Spa University- England) and The Sage (New Castle, England). With Big Boy Caprice he performs at the North Sea Jazz Festival in 2006.

He also starts doing studio work with several artists. For Alain Clark he records guitar for Alain's album "Live it Out" and co-writes "Go There" featured on the same album.

Ali B op Volle Toeren
In 2010 Pablo is asked to join the Ali B op volle toeren project. The concept of the TV-show involves making a new interpretation of old, famous Dutch songs. The songs get re-written by “The Sleepless” (Pablo Minoli, Pablo Penton and Brownie Dutch): every song including Ali B and a guest rapper. They worked with: Ben Cramer, Dennie Christian, Bonnie St.Claire, Henny Vrienten, Lenny Khur, Willeke Alberti and Anneke Grönloh; all big names in the Netherlands.  The show wins awards like “Positive Young Media Award” and gets an honor full mention at the Silver Nipkow awards. Also a CD/DVD has been released.  A second season of ABOVT is scheduled for November 2011.

Alain Clark
After earlier studio sessions in 2007, Pablo Minoli, Pablo Penton and Alain Clark join together in the studio for Alain's new album that releases May 18, 2012. Together they compose 13 songs for the 16 track album. Pablo Minoli also takes care of the guitar parts for the album, joined by Rogier Wagenaar and Alain Clark.
The album was presented on May 14, 2012, in Panama (club) in Amsterdam.

Discography

Albums
 Portadas - Laberinto (2005)
 Priority - Laberinto (1996)
 Freakeao - Laberinto (1998)
 Another Style - Laberinto (2000)
 Laberinto Live - Laberinto (2000)
 Década - Laberinto (2003)
 Ancestral Inhuman Thoughtless - D-Compose (2004)
 Separate Chain reaction - Laberinto (2006)

Ali B op Volle Toeren - Season 1

Ali B op Volle Toeren - Season 2

Alain Clark - Generation Love Revival - May 18, 2012

Guest appearances
1997: "Go There" (from Alain Clark album Live it Out)
 2006: "Movin On" - Corey
 2004: "A Tribute to Carlos" - Santanico
 2005: "The Ark" - John van der Veer
2005: "Barrio Latino" - Toro Ensemble

References

External links
Official Website
Twitter
Discogs

1970 births
Living people
People from Montevideo
Uruguayan guitarists
Uruguayan male guitarists
Dutch heavy metal guitarists
Dutch male guitarists
21st-century guitarists
21st-century male musicians